Hans Lang (8 February 1899 – 27 April 1943) was a German footballer who played as a midfielder.

Club career 
Lang played for BC Augsburg, SpVgg Fürth and Hamburger SV.

International career 
Lang was called up for the German national team. He won ten caps between 1922 and 1926.

Later life and death 
Following the outbreak of the Second World War, Lang was drafted into the Luftwaffe as a Oberfeldwebel. He died in April 1943 at Aalborg Air Base following a heart attack.

References

External links
 
 
 

1899 births
1943 deaths
Sportspeople from Augsburg
Association football midfielders
German footballers
Germany international footballers
SpVgg Greuther Fürth players
Hamburger SV players
Hamburger SV managers
Footballers from Bavaria
German football managers
Luftwaffe personnel of World War II